Nancy Henry (born 1965) is an American historian of English Studies at University of Tennessee, currently a Distinguished Humanities Professor.

References

Living people
University of Tennessee faculty
21st-century American historians
University of Chicago alumni
Stanford University alumni
1965 births